Arthurson Bluff is a mostly ice-covered bluff overlooking the confluence of Ludvig Glacier and Kirkby Glacier from the west, near the north coast of Victoria Land, Antarctica. A helicopter landing was made here by an Australian National Antarctic Research Expeditions (ANARE) party led by Phillip Law in 1962. The bluff was named by ANARE for Captain J. Arthurson, helicopter pilot with the expedition. Arthurson Bluff lies on the Pennell Coast, a portion of Antarctica lying between Cape Williams and Cape Adare.

References
 

Cliffs of Victoria Land
Pennell Coast